Addihalli,Hassan  is a village in the southern state of Karnataka, India. It is located in the Hassan taluk of Hassan district in Karnataka.

See also
 Hassan District
 Districts of Karnataka

References

External links
 http://Hassan.nic.in/

Villages in Hassan district